Manchester High School West, known as West High or West, is a public high school located in Manchester, New Hampshire. It is a part of the Manchester School District. According to the Blue Book: Manchester High School West Hand Book  (1940), the school was officially opened in September 1923 as a grade school and high school, hosting the seventh and eighth grades. In 1924, with an upsurge in enrollment to 136 pupils, the school became a dedicated high school. The first graduating class was in June 1925.

The courses of study originally offered by Manchester High School West were manual arts, home economics, the commercial course, the classical course (for those planning to go on to university) and the general course.

West is one of three public high schools in Manchester. Well over 2,000 students attended West at its peak enrollment.

West High School's mascot is the Blue Knight.

History

In the past, Bedford, a suburb of Manchester, sent its high school-aged students to West. In 2005 about 900 high school aged residents of Bedford attended Manchester West.

After a generation of debate and several votes, the town of Bedford eventually voted to build its own high school. The expanding class sizes at West and growing population of Bedford finally convinced Bedford voters of a need for a new high school. Beginning in fall 2007 Bedford stopped sending new students to Manchester West, so it could instead send them to Bedford High. By fall 2009 Bedford no longer sent any levels to Manchester West.

Bedford High School opened at the beginning of the 2007–2008 school year. With the opening of Bedford High School, Bedford students were phased out of West High School, reducing the enrollment at West to around 1,300 students. The New Hampshire Union-Leader stated that post-Bedford High opening the number of students "shrank considerably" and that in 2021 the number was still decreasing.

Demographics
The demographic breakdown of the 1192 students enrolled for the 2012-2013 school year was:

Male - 56.9%
Female - 43.1%
Native American/Alaskan - 0.7%
Asian/Pacific islander - 5.0%
Black - 8.3%
Hispanic - 10.4%
White - 72.2%
Multiracial - 3.4%

Athletics 

West athletics have a particularly strong rivalry with another city high school, Manchester Central.

The men's tennis team were state champions in 2005 and runners up in 2007.

In 2007 many of the students interested in playing ice hockey went to Bedford High, causing a decline in Manchester West's hockey team. The three public zoned high schools in Manchester proposed making a co-op hockey team taking from all three schools, but because the combined student population would be higher than that of Pinkerton Academy, the largest high school in the state, the New Hampshire Interscholastic Athletic Association (NHIAA) Classification Committee disallowed that move. West formed a common hockey team with Manchester Central.

Notable alumni

 Janel Bishop, 1991 Miss Teen USA
 Richard Camacho, member of Latin boyband CNCO
 Maurice McDonald, co-founder of McDonald's
 Richard McDonald, co-founder of McDonald's
 Josh Meyers, 1994, actor (MADtv, That '70s Show)
 Seth Meyers, 1992, cast member of Saturday Night Live; host of Late Night with Seth Meyers
 Charles Revson, founder of Revlon
 Anok Yai, fashion model

References

Sources
"Bedford Withdrawal from West Approved" by Riley Yates, The New Hampshire Union Leader, January 10, 2006.

External links 
 The official school website
 school district website

West
Public high schools in New Hampshire